In the branch of mathematics called knot theory, the volume conjecture is the following open problem that relates quantum invariants of knots to the hyperbolic geometry of knot complements.

Let O denote the unknot.

Then the volume conjecture states that

where vol(K) denotes the hyperbolic volume of the complement of K in the 3-sphere.

Kashaev's Observation 

He conjectured that for general hyperbolic knots the formula (2) would hold. His invariant for a knot  is based on the theory of quantum dilogarithms at the -th root of unity, .

Colored Jones Invariant 

 had firstly pointed out that Kashaev's invariant is related to the colored Jones polynomial by replacing q with the 2N-root of unity, namely, . They used an R-matrix as the discrete Fourier transform for the equivalence of these two values.

The volume conjecture is important for knot theory. In section 5 of this paper they state that:
 Assuming the volume conjecture, every knot that is different from the trivial knot has at least one different Vassiliev (finite type) invariant.

Relation to Chern-Simons theory 

Using complexification,  rewrote the formula (1) into

where  is called the Chern–Simons invariant. They showed that there is a clear relation between the complexified colored Jones polynomial and Chern–Simons theory from a mathematical point of view.

References
.
.
.
.

Knot theory
Conjectures
Unsolved problems in geometry